Willa, known as Willa of Tuscany (911/912–970), was a medieval noblewoman. By birth, she was a member of the Bosonid noble dynasty. By marriage to Berengar II of Italy she was Countess of Ivrea from 930 to 963, and queen consort of Italy from 950 to 963.

Life
Willa was the daughter of Boso, Margrave of Tuscany and his wife Willa of Burgundy. Boso was a grandson of Lothair II, King of Lotharingia via his mother, Bertha, and his elder brother Hugh was King of Italy. Willa of Burgundy was the daughter of Rudolph I of Burgundy and sister of Rudolph II of Burgundy.

Around 930 Willa married Berengar II of Italy. The marriage was arranged by Willa's paternal uncle Hugh of Italy. About 940, however, Berengar led an unsuccessful revolt of Italian nobles against Hugh. Afterwards, he fled to  the court of King Otto I of Germany. Although she was heavily pregnant, Willa left Italy, too, travelling through the Alps in the winter to rejoin her husband in Germany.

In 950 when Berengar was crowned king of Italy, Willa became his queen consort. Berengar held Willa in high regard and designated her his consors regni (partner in rule).

The contemporary chronicler Liutprand of Cremona, raised at the court at Pavia, wrote about both Berengar and Willa in negative terms. He included several particularly vivid accounts of Willa's character in his Antapodosis, including that she supposedly committed adultery with her chaplain Dominic, "a small priest, puny in height, soot-coloured, rustic, hairy, intractable, rough, shaggy, wild, uncouth, crazy; rebellious, iniquitous, with a tail-like appendage". In order to avoid discovery, Willa apparently cast spells upon her husband. When Berengar held Adelaide of Italy captive in 951 Willa supposedly mistreated her.

When Berengar was fighting against Otto I, Holy Roman Emperor in the early 960s, Willa and her sons, Adalbert of Italy and Guy of Ivrea were frequently by his side. After Otto deposed Berengar, Willa and Berengar were taken as prisoners to Bavaria. After Berengar's death in 966 Willa retired to a nunnery in Bamberg, where she remained for the rest of her life. The date of her death is not known exactly.

Marriage and issue
With Berengar, Willa had several children, including: 
Adalbert 
Guy
Conrad
Rozala
Gerberga, wife of Aleram of Montferrat
Gisela, a nun
Bertha, abbess of San Sisto in Piacenza

Notes

References
H. Keller, 'Bosone di Toscana' Dizionario Biografico degli Italiani - Volume 13 (1971).
P. Delogu, 'Berengario II, marchese d'Ivrea, re d'Italia' Dizionario Biografico degli Italiani - Vol. 9 (1967).
P. Skinner, Women in Medieval Italian Society, 500-1200 (Harlow, 2001). 
P. Squatriti, trans., The Complete Works of Liutprand of Cremona (Washington DC, 2007).
Detlev Schwennicke, Europäische Stammtafeln: Stammtafeln zur Geschichte der Europäischen Staaten, Neue Folge, Band II (Marburg, Germany: J. A. Stargardt, 1984).
P. Buc, ‘Italian Hussies and German Matrons. Liutprand of Cremona on Dynastic Legitimacy,’ Frühmittelalterliche Studien 29 (1995), 207-225.

Italian queens consort
910s births
Queen mothers
970 deaths
Year of birth uncertain
10th-century Italian women
10th-century Italian nobility